Baharestan is a locality east of the central part of Tehran in Iran. The historical Baharestan building is located in this neighborhood.

Kendriya Vidyalaya Tehran, the Embassy of India School, is in Baharestan.

Gallery

References

Neighbourhoods in Tehran

pt:Baharestan